Jean Véronis  (3 June 1955 – 8 September 2013) was a French linguist, computer scientist and blogger, and a research professor at Aix-Marseille University. His research interests included natural language processing, text mining and standardisation. He was a founder of the field that is now called digital humanities.

In 2006, his blog was listed among the 15 most influential by Le Monde.

Bibliography 
 Contribution to the study of error in natural language man-machine dialogue /Contribution a l'etude de l'erreur dans le dialogue homme-machine en language naturel. Ph.D. Thesis, Aix-Marseille University. 1988. http://hdl.handle.net/10068/23512 / http://www.sudoc.fr/006502245
 Text Encoding Initiative - Background and Context. Nancy Ide and Jean Véronis. 1995. 
 Parallel Text Processing: Alignment and Use of Translation Corpora (Text, Speech and Language Technology). Jean Véronis. 2000
 Parallel Text Processing: Alignment and Use of Translation Corpora (Text, Speech and Language Technology). Jean Véronis. Second edition 2010. 
 Les mots de Nicolas Sarkozy. Louis-Jean Calvet and  Jean Véronis. 2008. 
 Les politiques mis au Net : l'aventure du PoliTIC'Show. Estelle Veronis, Jean Véronis and Nicolas Voisin. 2007. 
 Combat Pour l'Elysée : Paroles de prétendants. Louis-Jean Calvet, Jean Véronis and Plantu. 2006.

References

1955 births
2013 deaths
Academic staff of Aix-Marseille University
French bloggers
French male writers
Male bloggers
Paul Cézanne University alumni
Scientists from Toulon
People in digital humanities
Vassar College faculty
Natural language processing researchers
Computational linguistics researchers
Data miners